Leyla Göksun (born 19 July 1983) is a Turkish actress.

Career 
When Göksun was 14, she went to England and studied 6 years as a boarder at the International Turkish High School. In 2007, she graduated from Yeditepe University with a degree in communications. She started her career by joining the Gaye Sökmen Agency. She initially worked as a model for magazine and then played in various commercials. She portrayed a blind girl named Gönül in the Kurtlar Vadisi series. Göksun took theatre lessons at Academy Kenter. She made her cinematic debut in 2009 by appearing as Ece in the movie Dabbe 2. She joined the cast of Doktorlar as an extra, but later her breakthrough came by portraying a leading role in the same series as Ela.

Personal life 
In 2011, Göksun married director Cemal Alpan, but the marriage lasted for seven months. She married businessman Mert Alacahanlı in July 2016.

Filmography

References

External links 
 

1990 births
Actresses from Istanbul
Yeditepe University alumni
Turkish television actresses
Turkish film actresses
Turkish stage actresses
Living people